The Historic Nolensville School, is a former public school in Nolensville, Tennessee, that had for many years served as the community's recreation center (the Nolensville Recreation Center).

The school was built in 1937 using  a Rosenwald School plan.  It was the "first modern educational building" in Nolensville and is unusual as the only school for whites in Tennessee that was built to a Rosenwald School plan. African American students did not attend the school until it was integrated in 1966.

A gymnasium was added in 1948. The building became a community recreation center in 1972 after a new school was built to replace it. In 2009, after the town of Nolensville announced plans to convert the 1972 school into a new recreation center, the Nolensville Historical Society began a campaign to preserve the old Nolensville School for use as a community center. The building was listed on the National Register of Historic Places on March 20, 2012.

References 

School buildings on the National Register of Historic Places in Tennessee
School buildings completed in 1937
Buildings and structures in Williamson County, Tennessee
Schools in Tennessee
National Register of Historic Places in Williamson County, Tennessee
1937 establishments in Tennessee